Sofia Church, named after the Swedish queen Sophia of Nassau, is one of the major churches in Stockholm, Sweden. It was designed during an architectural contest in 1899 and was inaugurated in 1906. It is located in the eastern part of the island of Södermalm, standing on the north east peak of the Vita Bergen park. Sofia church belongs to Sofia parish of the Church of Sweden.

See also
 List of churches in Stockholm

References

Churches in Stockholm
20th-century Church of Sweden church buildings
Churches completed in 1906
Churches in the Diocese of Stockholm (Church of Sweden)
1906 establishments in Sweden